The Wargrave Challenge Cup is a rowing event for women's eights at the annual Henley Royal Regatta on the River Thames at Henley-on-Thames in England. It is open to female crews from all eligible clubs (not university, college or school) and rowers who are not former or current internationals.

History
The event was supposed to have been run for the first time during 2020 but due to the COVID-19 pandemic it was not held.

Winners

References

Events at Henley Royal Regatta
Rowing trophies and awards